Denmark was represented by Bjørn Tidmand, with the song "Sangen om dig", at the 1964 Eurovision Song Contest, which took place on 21 March in Copenhagen following the victory of Grethe and Jørgen Ingmann for Denmark the previous year. "Sangen om dig" was chosen as the Danish entry at the Dansk Melodi Grand Prix on 15 February.

Before Eurovision

Dansk Melodi Grand Prix 1964
The DMGP was held at the Tivoli in Copenhagen, hosted by Bent Fabricius-Bjerre. Nine songs took part, with the winner chosen by postcard voting. Only the top 3 placings are known, and the fact that "Sangen om dig" would seem to have gained a comprehensive victory as it received 43.8% of all votes cast (102,171 out of 233,465). Former Danish representatives Gustav Winckler, Raquel Rastenni and Dario Campeotto were all back for another try.

At Eurovision
On the night of the final Tidmand performed 4th in the running order, following Norway and preceding Finland. As with all performances from the 1964 contest apart from Gigliola Cinquetti's winning reprise, only an audio recording of Tidmand's performance is known to survive. Each national jury awarded 5-3-1 to their top 3 songs and at the close of voting "Sangen om dig" had received 4 points (3 from Spain and 1 from Norway), placing Denmark 9th of the 16 entries. The Danish jury awarded its 5 points to Norway.

Voting

References 

1964
Countries in the Eurovision Song Contest 1964
Eurovision